Hsu Chung Pi-hsia (born 20 March 1948) is a Taiwanese politician who served in the Legislative Yuan from 1999 to 2002.

She studied education at National Chengchi University and became a teacher.

Hsu Chung is married to Hsu Hsin-liang, with whom she has a son.

References

1948 births
Living people
20th-century Taiwanese women politicians
National Chengchi University alumni
Taiwanese schoolteachers
Taoyuan City Members of the Legislative Yuan
Members of the 4th Legislative Yuan
Democratic Progressive Party Members of the Legislative Yuan
21st-century Taiwanese women politicians
Spouses of Taiwanese politicians